Laura Flanders (born 5 December 1961) is an English broadcast journalist living in the United States who presents the weekly, long-form interview show The Laura Flanders Show. Flanders has described herself as a "lefty person". The brothers Alexander, Andrew and Patrick Cockburn, all journalists, are her half-uncles. Author Lydia Davis is her half-aunt. Her sister is Stephanie Flanders, a former BBC journalist. Actress Olivia Wilde is her cousin.

Early life
Flanders is the daughter of the British comic songwriter and broadcaster Michael Flanders and the American-born Claudia Cockburn, first daughter of radical journalist Claud Cockburn and American author Hope Hale Davis. She was raised in the Kensington district of London and moved to the U.S. in 1980 at age 19. She graduated from Barnard College of Columbia University in 1985 with a degree in history and women's studies.

Career

Flanders was founding director of the women's desk at the media watch group Fairness and Accuracy in Reporting (FAIR), and for a decade produced and hosted CounterSpin, FAIR's syndicated radio program. In January 1993, she appeared on the ABC Good Morning America program as a spokesperson for FAIR to discuss how domestic violence increases during the annual Super Bowl.

Flanders hosted the weekday radio show Your Call on KALW, before starting the Saturday/Sunday evening Laura Flanders Show on Air America Radio in 2004. It became the weekly one-hour Radio Nation in 2007, and a daily TV show on Free Speech TV, "GRITtv with Laura Flanders" in 2008. That show aired for three years on Free Speech TV before moving to KCET/Linktv and teleSUR, as a weekly program. Flanders is a contributing writer for The Nation, and Yes Magazine and has also contributed to In These Times, The Progressive and Ms., magazine.

She has authored six books, including Blue Grit: True Democrats Take Back Politics from the Politicians (Penguin Press 2007); Bushwomen: Tales of a Cynical Species (Verso, 2004), a study of the women in George W. Bush's cabinet; and a collection of essays, Real Majority, Media Minority: The Cost of Sidelining Women in Reporting (1997). She edited "At the Tea Party...." (O/R Books 2010) and The W Effect: Sexual Politics in the Age of Bush (2004) and contributed to The Contenders, (Seven Stories, 2008) among others.

The Laura Flanders Show
In 2008, Flanders began hosting and executive producing The Laura Flanders Show. The Laura Flanders Show is a 30-minute news and public affairs show that explores actionable models for creating a better world by reporting on the people and movements driving systemic change. Its tagline is, "Where the people who say it can't be done take a back seat to the people who are doing it."

The show originally aired weekly on Free Speech TV and teleSUR. In 2018, it became a coproduction of CUNY TV.

In 2019, The Laura Flanders Show was picked up for distribution by American Public Television and in 2020 began airing on PBS stations across the United States, including in 20 of the country's top 25 television markets.

Personal life
Flanders is a lesbian. In 2019, she married her partner of 30 years, choreographer Elizabeth Streb.

Flanders currently resides in Smallwood, New York.

Awards

References

External links

The Laura Flanders Show

1961 births
Living people
American alternative journalists
American broadcast news analysts
American political commentators
American political writers
American radio journalists
American talk radio hosts
American women radio presenters
Barnard College alumni
Cockburn family
English emigrants to the United States
English people of American descent
English people of Scottish descent
American lesbian writers
People from Kensington
People from Manhattan
Radio personalities from New York City
Radio personalities from San Francisco
The Nation (U.S. magazine) people